William Best (ca 1707 – November 17, 1782) was a political figure in Nova Scotia. He was a member of the 1st General Assembly of Nova Scotia from 1758 to 1759, and the 3rd & 4th assemblies from 1761 to 1770.

He came to Halifax in 1749 and later settled at Cornwallis. In 1779, with John Burbidge, he helped establish an Anglican church there. In 1783, he was named a justice of the peace for King's County. Best died in Halifax at the age of 75.

One of his descendants, Charles Herbert Best, discovered insulin with Frederick Banting.

References 

 

1707 births
1782 deaths
Nova Scotia pre-Confederation MLAs